Philip Aldborough de la Perrelle (1872 – 7 December 1935) was a New Zealand politician of the Liberal Party and the United Party.

Biography

Early life
De la Perrelle was born at Arrowtown in 1872. He was a newspaper proprietor and owned the Lake Country Press from age 21, and the Winton Record from 1912.

Political career

He represented the Southland electorate of Awarua in Parliament from  when he defeated John Ronald Hamilton of the Reform Party.

He was a cabinet minister in the Ward and Forbes Ministries of the United Government from 1928 to 1931; Internal Affairs (1928–1931).

In May 1935, he was awarded the King George V Silver Jubilee Medal.

De la Perrelle was twice married. He died on 7 December 1935, and was survived by his second wife and three sons.

Notes

References

1872 births
1935 deaths
United Party (New Zealand) MPs
New Zealand Liberal Party MPs
Members of the Cabinet of New Zealand
People from Arrowtown
Members of the New Zealand House of Representatives
New Zealand MPs for South Island electorates
Unsuccessful candidates in the 1925 New Zealand general election